Nelson David Cabrera Báez (born 22 April 1983 in Itauguá) is a football defender who plays for Club Always Ready. Born in Paraguay, he represented the Paraguay national football team once in a friendly before naturalizating as a Bolivian and switching to represent Bolivia internationally.

Career
Cabrera started his career at Olimpia Asunción and moved to rivals Cerro Porteño in 2005. There he won two championships and was team captain from 2007 to 2008. He was then transferred to CSD Colo Colo of Chile for $1,000,000. In the 2009–2010 season he played for CFR Cluj of Romania, where he won the National League and played in the UEFA Europa League.

Cabrera was born and raised in Paraguay, and represented their national team in a friendly match in 2007. However, later in his career he played in Bolivia, gained their nationality and debuted officially for the Bolivia national football team in 2016. FIFA regulations required players switching nationalities to have resided in the country for at least five years, but Cabrera only had for four. He was subsequently found to be ineligible by FIFA resulting in forfeiture of the preliminary 2018 FIFA World Cup qualification games between Bolivia and Peru on 1 September 2016 and between Chile and Bolivia on 6 September 2016. Bolivia appealed the decision of FIFA to their own appeal committee, and then to the Court of Arbitration for Sport. It was not disputed that Cabrera was ineligible. However, Bolivia questioned FIFA's right to investigate, and argued that a protest must be submitted within an hour of the match in question. Both appeals were dismissed.

The investigation on Cabrera's eligibility was requested by the Chilean Football Federation; however, this eventually backfired for Chile, as Peru, who were also benefitted by the investigation's outcome, would qualify to the intercontinental play-offs against New Zealand, eliminating Chile by merely a narrow goal difference. That is because Peru got the third valuable point after they lost to Bolivia earlier while Chile, who drew Bolivia, only got two. Cabrera celebrated Chile's elimination by tweeting "God knows what He is doing and His times are perfect," followed by an image indicating that Chile would have qualified to the play-offs had the investigation never occurred.

Honours
Cerro Porteño
 Paraguayan Primera División: 2005
Colo-Colo
 Chilean Primera División: 2009 Clausura
CFR Cluj
 Romanian League: 2009–10
 Romanian Cup: 2009–10
Club Bolivar
 Bolivian First Division: 2013 Clausura, 2014 Apertura, 2015 Clausura

Notes

References

External links
 
 

1983 births
Living people
People from Itauguá
Bolivian footballers
Bolivia international footballers
Paraguayan footballers
Paraguay international footballers
Paraguayan emigrants to Bolivia
Naturalized citizens of Bolivia
Dual internationalists (football)
Bolivian expatriate footballers
Paraguayan expatriate footballers
Association football defenders
Paraguayan Primera División players
Chilean Primera División players
Bolivian Primera División players
Liga I players
China League One players
Club Olimpia footballers
Cerro Porteño players
Sportivo Luqueño players
Colo-Colo footballers
CFR Cluj players
Chongqing Liangjiang Athletic F.C. players
Copa América Centenario players
Club Always Ready players
Club Bolívar players
Expatriate footballers in Chile
Expatriate footballers in Romania
Expatriate footballers in China
Paraguayan expatriate sportspeople in Romania